Women's Prison (French: Prisons de femmes) is a 1958 French drama film directed by Maurice Cloche and starring Danièle Delorme, Jacques Duby and Vega Vinci. It is based on the 1930 novel of the same title by Francis Carco previously made into the 1938 French film Women's Prison and the 1947 Swedish film Two Women.

The film's sets were designed by the art director Robert Giordani and Jean Mandaroux.

Cast
 Danièle Delorme as Alice Rémon ou Dumas
 Jacques Duby as René
 Vega Vinci as Gigi
 Jane Marken as Mme Rémon, la belle-mère d'Alice
 Mireille Perrey as Mme Vertin - la mère de René
 Gabriel Cattand as L'avocat
 Germaine Kerjean as La directrice
 Louis Arbessier as Le directeur de la prison
 Joëlle Bernard as Une détenue
 George Cusin as Le juge d'instruction
 Dominique Davray as Une collègue d'Alice
 Jacques Dynam as Le médecin
 Michel Etcheverry as Le substitut
 Henri-Jacques Huet as Mario
 Nicolas Amato as Un journaliste
 Georges Lycan as Le docteur de la prison
 Raymone as Une vieille détenue
 Jackie Sardou as Lulu

References

Bibliography 
 Goble, Alan. The Complete Index to Literary Sources in Film. Walter de Gruyter, 1999.

External links 
 

1958 films
1958 drama films
French drama films
1950s French-language films
French black-and-white films
Films directed by Maurice Cloche
Films based on French novels
Remakes of French films
1950s French films